The 2013 FIBA Europe SuperCup Women was the fourth edition of the FIBA Europe SuperCup Women. It was held on 29 October 2013 at the Palace of Sports "Uralochka" in Yekaterinburg, Russia.

Time
Times are CET (UTC+1).

Final

References

External links
 SuperCup Women

FIBA Europe SuperCup Women
2013–14 in European basketball
2013–14 in Russian basketball
International basketball competitions hosted by Russia
Sport in Yekaterinburg